Santa Cruz de Bezana is a municipality located in the autonomous community of Cantabria, Spain.

Localilities 

 Azoños
 Maoño
 Mompía
 Prezanes
 Sancibrián
 Bezana (capital)
 Soto de la Marina

Twin towns
 Martignas-sur-Jalle, France

References

External links
Official website

Municipalities in Cantabria